Felonica is a frazione of the comune (municipality) of Sermide e Felonica in the Province of Mantua in the Italian region Lombardy, located about  southeast of Milan and about  southeast of Mantua. It was a separate comune until  2017. 
 

Cities and towns in Lombardy